Gros Morne National Park is a Canadian national park and World Heritage Site located on the west coast of Newfoundland.

The park takes its name from Newfoundland's second-highest mountain peak (at ) located within the park. Its French meaning is "large mountain standing alone," or more literally "great sombre."  Gros Morne is a member of the Long Range Mountains, an outlying range of the Appalachian Mountains, stretching the length of the island's west coast.  It is the eroded remnants of a mountain range formed 1.2 billion years ago. In 1987, the park was awarded World Heritage Site status by UNESCO because "The park provides a rare example of the process of continental drift, where deep ocean crust and the rocks of the earth's mantle lie exposed."

The Gros Morne National Park Reserve was established in 1973, and was made a national park on October 1, 2005.

The park was the subject of a short film in 2011's National Parks Project.

Geology
The park's rock formations, made famous by Robert Stevens and Harold Williams, include oceanic crust and mantle rock exposed by the obduction process of plate tectonics, as well as sedimentary rock formed during the Ordovician, Precambrian granite and Palaeozoic igneous rocks.

The park is located in the Great Northern Peninsula of Western Newfoundland. This peninsula is referred to as the Humber Zone, a Miogeocline, the Highlands of which contain the largest external basement massif of the Grenville Orogeny in the Appalachian Orogen.  This Precambrian basement is known as the Long Range Inlier, Long Range Complex or Basement Gneiss Complex, consisting of quartz–feldspar gneisses and granites that are up to 1550 Ma in age. Mt. Gros Morne and Mt. Big Level lie within this Inlier.  The western boundary of this inlier (along Western Brook Pond, St. Pauls Inlet, and south of Portl Creek Pond) consists of Devonian and Ordovician thrust faults, where crystalline rocks thrust over Cambrian–Ordovician carbonate rocks and the Lower Paleozoic Humber Arm Allochthon.  The Rocky Harbour mélange is a Lower–Middle Ordovician collection of greywacke, quartzite, dolomite shale, chert, limestone blocks within a black, green, and red scaly shale matrix, which occurs along the shore from West Brook Pond to Humber Arm (Bay of Islands).  The south portion of the park, Table Mtn. (Tablelands) and North Arm Mtn., consists of Upper Cambrian and Lower Ordovician ophiolites known as the Bay of Islands Complex, Little Post Complex, and Old Man Cove Formation.  Finally, a Pleistocene ice cap flowed radially across the island, developing fjords such as Bonne Bay.

Tablelands

The Tablelands, found between the towns of Trout River and Woody Point in south west of Gros Morne National Park, look more like a barren desert than traditional Newfoundland. This is due to the ultramafic rock – peridotite – which makes up the Tablelands. It is thought to originate in the Earth's mantle and was forced up from the depths during a plate collision several hundred million years ago. Peridotite lacks some of the usual nutrients required to sustain most plant life and has a toxic quality, hence its barren appearance. Peridotite is also high in iron, which accounts for its brownish colour (rusted colour). Underneath this weathered zone, the rock is really a dark green colour.

Soils 
The many soil associations mapped in the park reflect the wide variety of bedrock. The Silver Mountain soil association, dominant in the northeastern area, is a very stony sandy loam developed on glacial till overlying granite, granitic gneiss and schist. Similar rocks underlie the St. Paul's Inlet association farther west. Sedimentary rocks (including some dolomitic limestone) in the southeastern sector support the North Lake association of stony sandy loam. An association of mostly-shallow loam, the Cox's Cove, occupies a discontinuous band over shale, slate, limestone and sandstone near the coast. The coastal strip north of Bonne Bay is mostly underlain by the peaty Gull's Marsh association and the coarse Sally's Cove association except for an area of clay (Wood's Island association) around Rocky Harbour. The stony infertile soils of the ultramafic tablelands south of Bonne Bay belong to the Serpentine Range association.

Western Brook Pond – Fjord
Western Brook Pond is a fresh water fjord which was carved out by glaciers during the most recent ice age from 25,000 to about 10,000 years ago. Once the glaciers melted, the land, which had been pushed down by the weight of the ice sheet, rebounded and the outlet to the sea was cut off. The water in the fjord is extremely pure and is assigned the highest purity rating available for natural bodies of water. Pissing Mare Falls, the highest waterfall in eastern North America and 199th highest in the world, flows into Western Brook Pond. Sedimentary rocks, some of them calcareous, underlie the westernmost shores. Elsewhere, granitic gneiss is dominant.

Nature and wildlife

The most notable animal in the park is the moose, part of a booming population that was introduced to Newfoundland around 1900. Other common wildlife in the park include red foxes and Arctic foxes, an ecotype of caribou (R.t caribou), black bears, snowshoe hares, red squirrels, lynxes, river otters and beavers. Harbour seals are common in St. Pauls inlet, and cetaceans (minkes, humpbacks, fins, pilots, orcas, atlantic white-sided dolphins, harbour porpoises) may be in the area especially during the capelin season in early summer. Many bird species can be found in the park, from shorebirds along the ocean to birds of the bogs and interior forests.

World Heritage Site
In 1987, the park was designated a UNESCO World Heritage Site for both its geological history and its exceptional scenery. The geology of the park in particular illustrates the concept of plate tectonics, and has shed important light on geological evolution and its processes.

In respect of its key role in the development of an understanding of plate tectonics, the Mohorovičić discontinuity at Gros Morne was included by the International Union of Geological Sciences (IUGS) in its assemblage of 100 'geological heritage sites' around the world in a listing published in October 2022.

Trails
Hiking the trails is a popular activity at Gros Morne.  There are about 20 marked day trip trails, exploring coastal and interior areas of the park.  One of the more strenuous dayhikes is the 16 km hike over Gros Morne Mountain.  This trail is also called the James Callaghan Trail after the former British Prime Minister, who visited in 1976, in recognition of his conservation efforts. A small controversy arose after the Prime Minister did not visit the trail that had been named in his honour.

The interior of the park can also be accessed, notably through the multi-day Long Range Traverse between Western Brook Pond and Gros Morne Mountain.

Arts and culture 
The park is home to many arts festivals, including Gros Morne Theatre Festival, Writers at Woody Point, Gros Morne Summer Music, and Trails, Tales and Tunes.

See also

National Parks of Canada
List of National Parks of Canada
Bonne Bay Marine Station
Green Point

References

External links
 Gros Morne: A Cultural History
 Park web site
 Park webpage at Worldheritagesite.org
 UNESCO WHS Gros Morne National Park
 Town of Woody Point

Heritage sites in Newfoundland and Labrador
National parks in Newfoundland and Labrador
World Heritage Sites in Canada
Protected areas established in 1987
1973 establishments in Newfoundland and Labrador
First 100 IUGS Geological Heritage Sites